Johan Svensson (born 2 October 1979, Falkenberg) is a Swedish professional road-racing cyclist.

He was on the 2005 Mitsubishi–Jartazi roster.

References

1979 births
People from Falkenberg
Swedish male cyclists
Road racing cyclists
Living people
Sportspeople from Halland County